Anselm was a cargo and passenger steamship built by Workman, Clark and Company in Belfast for the Booth Line service between Liverpool and the Amazon ports in Brazil. She was the second of four Booth Line ships to be named after Saint Anselm.

In 1922 an Argentinian shipping company bought Anselm and renamed her Comodoro Rivadavia. In 1942 the Argentinian government bought her and renamed her Rio Santa Cruz. She suffered a boiler explosion in 1952 and was scrapped in 1959.

Building
Anselm was designed as a larger version of Booth's 1903-built .

Ambrose had berths for 149 passengers in first class and 200 in steerage as originally built.

Workman, Clark and Company built Anselm in Belfast as yard number 214 for the Booth Steamship Company of Liverpool for £89,000. She was launched on 10 January 1905, delivered on 20 March and registered at Liverpool with the UK official number 120834 and code letters HCFR

Booth Line service
Anselm served Booth's main route between Liverpool and the Brazilian Amazon ports of Para (Belém) and Manaus in the Amazon rubber boom. Her maiden voyage, from Liverpool to Manaus, with calls at Le Havre, Lisbon, Funchal and Belém, began on 29 March 1905. On a later voyage, inbound to Manaus from Madeira, Anselm collided in the River Amazon with her running mate, Booth Line's , on 5 September 1905. The latter was outbound with a valuable cargo of rubber and due to complete loading at Belém. After the collision, Anselm put back to Belém for repairs to her bow and stem.

On a claim by some owners of Cyrils rubber cargo in the Admiralty Court, it was held that, although both ships had failed to comply with the Collision Regulations, Anselms failure had not caused the collision, and the Cyril was solely to blame. The Court of Appeal overturned that judgement and held that both vessels were at fault.

She was later refloated by the Liverpool Salvage Association's salvage steamer Ranger, which had just completed the successful recovery of most of the Cyril'''s cargo of rubber.

By 1913 Anselm was equipped for wireless telegraphy, operating on the 300 and 600 metre wavelengths. Her call sign was MDK.

In the First World War Anselm was chartered as a troop ship for a number of voyages to France in 1914–15 before returning to her regular liner service. She survived the war, and in 1918 was transferred to Booth Line's service between New York and the Amazon. In 1922, with the fleet being reduced following the end of the rubber boom, Anselm was sold to an Argentinian shipping company.

Argentinian service
In 1922 Argentina Compañía General de Navegación SA (ACGN) bought Anselm and renamed her Comodoro Rivadavia, after Patagonia's main port. She was re-registered in Buenos Aires and her code letters were changed to HBJP. By 1930 her gross register tonnage had been revised to 5,450.

ACGN had been founded in 1920 to replace the former Linea Nacional del Sud, an operation of the German shipping line Hamburg Südamerikanische Dampfschifffahrts-Gesellschaft serving Argentinian domestic routes between Buenos Aires and Patagonia with their own ships under Argentinian flag. Stronger cabotage restrictions introduced in the First World War made it expedient to establish a more clearly Argentinian-owned company. Hamburg Süd's long-serving and loyal principal agent in Argentina, Antonio M Delfino, and his family provided 45 percent of the capital for ACGN, the German company provided another 45 percent through a group led by lawyer Ernesto Aguirre, and the remaining 10 percent was held by independent shareholders. In addition the management of the fleet was entrusted to Delfino's agency company, A M Delfino y Compañia.

In 1923 Comodoro Rivadavia was put into service mainly on the Buenos Aires – Comodoro Rivadavia route alongside the passenger-cargo liner Buenos Aires (formerly Hamburg Süd's Camarones ex-Taquary), and replacing the same owner's Presidente Mitre ex-Argentina, which was sold to Chilean buyers. On 6 May 1931 the ship stranded in the Second Narrows, Straits of Magellan, but was successfully refloated two days later by the Chilean Navy.

In 1934 Comodoro Rivadavias code letters were superseded by the call sign LOFL.

In the decline in the Patagonian trade in the 1930s the main passenger route was reduced to a one-ship service, with first the Buenos Aires and then the Comodoro Rivadavia being withdrawn, with maintenance and painting being carried out during lay-up. In 1937, with continuing poor financial results, Hamburg Süd decided to withdraw and the ACGN company was liquidated, selling its assets to the newly-formed Argentina Nueva Compañía General de Navegación SA (ANCGN), which was wholly owned by the Delfino company.

Early in the Second World War the Delfino company, with its close involvement with Hamburg Süd, was blacklisted by the Allies, with the danger that its ships could be captured at sea by Allied naval forces; Comodoro Rivadavia was therefore laid up in Buenos Aires. In 1941, faced by a desperate need to resume sea transport both domestically and internationally, the Government of Argentina established Flota Mercante del Estado ("state merchant fleet"), to operate many ships of the belligerents interned in Argentina, as well as ANCGN's ships, which were transferred in March 1942. In 1944 she was renamed Rio Santa Cruz, and later reduced to cargo-only service

Explosion and disposal
At around 7am on 7 May 1952, en route from Puerto San Julián to Buenos Aires, Rio Santa Cruz'' suffered a major boiler explosion off Cabo Blanco, between Puerto Deseado and Comodoro Rivadavia, just as a storm was approaching. Six members of her engine room crew were killed when the casing of one boiler split, spreading 12 tons of boiling water in the boiler room and disabling the engine and generators. Nearby ships responded to an SOS call, but securing a tow-line was difficult in the storm conditions. After three days it was decided that the six dead crewmen would be buried at sea. The ship was later towed to port and withdrawn from service. In 1957 she was sold for demolition and broken up at Rio de Janeiro in 1959.

Notes

References

1905 ships
Maritime incidents in 1905
Maritime incidents in 1952
Merchant ships of Argentina
Merchant ships of the United Kingdom
Passenger ships of the United Kingdom
Ships of the Booth Steamship Company
Ships built in Belfast
Steamships of Argentina
Steamships of the United Kingdom
Troop ships of the United Kingdom
World War I passenger ships of the United Kingdom